Dacissé may refer  to:

 Dacissé, Nanoro
 Dacissé, Siglé